Kor Daraq (also  known as Gardaraq, Kar Darreh, Kordarreh, and Kyar-Dara) is a village in Guzal Darreh Rural District, Soltaniyeh District, Abhar County, Zanjan Province, Iran. At the 2006 census, its population was 127, in 43 families.

References 

Populated places in Abhar County